Mid Ulster can refer to:

 Central Ulster
 Mid Ulster (Assembly constituency)
 Mid Ulster (UK Parliament constituency)
 Mid Ulster (district)
 Mid Ulster English